The Ruian dialect (pronounced  in the Rui'an dialect; standard ) is a dialect of Wu Chinese spoken in Ruian. It belongs to the Oujiang sub-group of Wu Chinese dialects. It is closely related to the Pingyang dialect and Lucheng dialect, generally referred to as Wenzhounese.

Phonology

Initials

Finals
Rui'an has the following finals:

嘸 , 兒 

姹 , 好 , 包 

海 , 先 , 思 

下 , 布  ~ 圖  ~ 水 

全 , 安 , 歌 

會 , 走 

李 , 六 

涼 , 關 , 花 

經 , 聽 , 公 .

Additional finals for older accents include

天 , 橋 , 頭

Tones
In the Ruian dialect, a monosyllabic word can have one of the eight tones, but there are only four phonetically distinguished tones, divided into high (陰) and low (陽) categories. In combination with another tone, it can change depending on the tone sandhi system.

Yin Ping 陰平  44 江天飛三

Yang Ping 陽平  31 來同魚球

Yin Shang 陰上  35 懂紙古本

Yang Shang 陽上  24 近淡厚似

Yin Qu 陰去  52 對去貨歲

Yang Qu 陽去  22 外地路住

Yin Ru 陰入  323 七博塔各

Yang Ru 陽入  212 六肉白石

Tone sandhi

In bisyllabic words, the Rui'an dialect phonetically has only six tones, high flat ˦, middle flat ˧, rising ˨˦, departing ˦˨, entering ˨˩˨ and short ˨. We'll now use A, B, C, D, E, and 0 for these six tones.

Grammar

Sentence Structure

Classifiers

Verbs

Adverbs

Ruian dialect

Lexicon

Pronouns

Numerals

1 used when are alone or follow 第 to form ordinal numerals, and the later three lectures are cardinal numerals and are generally followed by a classifier.
2 the first lecture is considered literal, the second colloquial.

Vocabulary
Below is a list of the most common vocabulary in Ruian dialect.

Readings

Like other Wu dialects, in the Ruian dialect a Chinese character can have more than one reading, divided into vernacular readings (白讀) and literary readings (文讀), in comparison with other Wu dialects, the Ruian dialect has relatively few multiple readings. 
Below are some samples.

See also
Shanghainese, another Wu Chinese dialect
Suzhou dialect
Ruian, the city
Wenzhounese, of which the variety of Rui'an is considered a dialect

References
A Study on the Phonetics of Ruian Dialect

Wu Chinese